Cruiserweight Championship may refer to:

 NXT Cruiserweight Championship
 List of cruiserweight boxing champions
 List of major cruiserweight professional wrestling championships
 A cruiserweight competition is a type of competitive running sport which takes place on sailing boats.